Proeulia longula is a species of moth of the family Tortricidae. It is found in Chile in the Bío Bío and Maule regions.

The wingspan is 20 mm. The ground colour of the forewings is whitish, preserved in the costal part of the wing and in the form of some spots in the postmedian and apical areas. The strigulae (fine streaks) and dots are rust and the dorsal half of the wing is rust brown. The hindwings are whitish, the anal area grey.

Etymology
The species name refers to some elongate parts of the genitalia and is derived from Latin longus (meaning long) and ula (a suffix expressing a diminution).

References

Moths described in 2010
Proeulia
Moths of South America
Taxa named by Józef Razowski
Endemic fauna of Chile